Cyclophora nebulosata is a moth of the family Geometridae first described by Francis Walker in 1862. It is found in Sri Lanka.

The caterpillar is known to feed on Ficus racemosa.

References

Moths of Asia
Moths described in 1893